Beverley Doris Shore Bennett  (born 1928) is a portrait artist and glass artist from New Zealand. Her work is included in the collection of the New Zealand Portrait Gallery and she is a Fellow of the British Society of Master Glass Painters.

Biography 
Shore Bennett was born in Wellington to Edith Carter and Martin Shore. She attended Samuel Marsden Collegiate School from 1934 to 1945. Her art teacher there, Betty Rhind, gave her extra classes in portrait drawing. From 1946 to 1950 she attended Wellington Technical College.

In 1948 Shore Bennett joined the New Zealand Academy of Fine Arts, exhibiting her work there, and continued as an exhibiting member until 1967. She travelled to England and studied at the Byam Shaw School of Art from 1951 to 1953, majoring in portraiture. While there, she had two portraits accepted for the 1953 Royal Academy summer show.

In 1953 Shore Bennett returned to New Zealand and started designing stained glass windows. In the early 1960s she designed windows for Waiapu Cathedral of Saint John the Evangelist in Napier. At the dedication of the windows at Saint John's Cathedral, she said: 

In 1969, she was asked to design the portable font for the Wellington Cathedral of St Paul by the dean, Walter Hurst, which then led to her being invited to design the Holm Memorial window for the cathedral. She later designed the cathedral's dossal hangings, which took her three years to make, and windows for the Lady Chapel and ambulatory. She also designed and fabricated church vestments.

In 1972, she was appointed a Fellow of the British Society of Master Glass Painters, becoming the first New Zealander to be appointed to this society. In the 1980 Queen's Birthday Honours, she was made a Member of the Order of the British Empire, for services to art.

It is estimated that over the course of her career, Shore Bennett designed between three and four hundred windows in churches, chapels and cathedrals around New Zealand. In 1974, she wrote the book, A Key to Embroidery, which has had two editions.

Shore Bennett was made a lay canon for the arts in the Anglican Diocese of Wellington in 1976. , she is a lay canon emeritus. She was involved with Zonta International: she was charter president of the Wellington Zonta Club and Australasian Governor of Zonta International from 1976 to 1978. From 1979 to 2008, she served on the board of management and trust board of Samuel Marsden Collegiate School.

Personal life 
Shore Bennett married Peter Osborne Bennett after she returned to New Zealand from Britain in the early 1950s. The couple had three daughters. Peter Bennett died in 2002. Shore Bennett lives in retirement in Waikanae.

References 

1928 births
Living people
People from Wellington City
New Zealand glass artists
20th-century New Zealand artists
New Zealand Members of the Order of the British Empire
People educated at Samuel Marsden Collegiate School